Tight Knot is another name of the Soviet film Sasha Enters Life.

Tight Knot may also refer to:

 A track from the Valtari album by Icelandic post-rock band Sigur Rós
 A British-Ukrainian war-game, see 2006 anti-NATO protests in Feodosia